Pedro R. Cabuay Jr. is a Filipino lawyer and retired military personnel who served as Director General of the National Intelligence Coordinating Agency under the administration of President Gloria Macapagal Arroyo from October 2008 to 2010. He retired as Lieutenant General in the Armed Forces of the Philippines in 2006 after serving as Commander, AFP Southern Luzon Command. He also served as Chief of the Intelligence Service of the Armed Forces of the Philippines (ISAFP).

References

Filipino generals
Armed Forces of the Philippines
Philippine Army
Philippine Military Academy alumni
Living people
Heads of government agencies of the Philippines
Arroyo administration personnel
Year of birth missing (living people)